Irāvatī  is the ninth studio album by Megumi Hayashibara. The album was released in two editions, a regular edition and a limited edition with cardboard sleeve and hardcover photobook. It has also been reissued on at least one occasion. The album reached #5 on the Oricon weekly charts, charted for 8 weeks, selling 277,060 copies. This is her best selling album to date.

Track listing

References

External links
 

1997 albums
Megumi Hayashibara albums